Blore with Swinscoe is a civil parish in the district of Staffordshire Moorlands, Staffordshire, England. It contains ten listed buildings that are recorded in the National Heritage List for England. Of these, one is listed at Grade I, the highest of the three grades, and the others are at Grade II, the lowest grade.  The parish contains the villages of Blore and Swinscoe and the surrounding countryside.  The listed buildings consist of a church and a cross in the churchyard, a house, a bridge, a cowhouse, structures at an entrance to Ilam Park, and two mileposts.


Key

Buildings

References

Citations

Sources

Lists of listed buildings in Staffordshire